None is a comune (municipality) in the Metropolitan City of Turin in the Italian region Piedmont, located about  southwest of Turin.

None borders the following municipalities: Orbassano, Volvera, Candiolo, Piobesi Torinese, Airasca, Castagnole Piemonte, and Scalenghe.

Places of interest
Chiesa della Confraternita dello Spirito Santo e di San Rocco
Santi Gervasio e Protasio - parish church
San Rocco - 16th-century church

Community facilities
In the town are a library and a cinema, two kindergartens, two elementary schools and a high school as well as two pharmacies.

References

External links
 Official website